WFQY is a classic hip-hop radio station, licensed to Brandon, Mississippi and serving the Jackson, Mississippi area.

From July 2019 to June 2020, WFQY has been simulcasting WJMF-LP (87-7 The Bridge).

The station began as WRKN in the late 1960s as a country station. Longtime owners were Roy and June Harris. For a short time the station had a 1950s based oldies format and also had a country gospel format for while. In later years it simulcast its sister station WRJH 97.7 FM with a Southern Gospel format. After WRJH was sold, WRKN AM continued to operate with a Southern Gospel format. After the retirement of the owner the station emerged as an affiliate of the "Real Country" network with classic country with call letters WZQK.

On May 19, 2008, WZQK (Real Country 970) switched from classic country to all-sports. And the station's call letters became WJFN.

WJFN also operates a 99-watt low-power translator at 99.1 FM—W256BL—located in Jackson, but is licensed to Ridgeland, Mississippi.

On April 5, 2012, WJFN changed its call letters to WFQY and on April 20, 2012, WFQY changed its format to classic hip hop, branded as BDay 99-1.

In July 2019 (after brief period of silence), WFQY resumed broadcasting, but was actually simulcasting WJMF-LP.

In June 2020, classic hip-hop returned to WFQY.

External links

FQY
Classic hip hop radio stations in the United States
Brandon, Mississippi